The Data & Marketing Association (formerly, Direct Marketing Association), also known as the DMA, is a trade organization for marketers. In 2017 their web site stated "Yes, 100 years ago we were the Direct Mail Marketing Association and then the Direct Marketing Association. Now we embrace ..."

Although headquartered in the United States, its members include companies from 48 other countries, including half of the Fortune 100 companies, as well as many nonprofit organizations. The DMA seeks to advance all forms of direct marketing.

A mid-2018 joint announcement with the Association of National Advertisers, stated as "to be completed as of July 1, 2018" and having as its goal "the single largest trade association in the U.S. devoted to serving all aspects of marketing" had not materialized as of the projected date.

As of July 1, 2019, DMA became the Data, Marketing & Analytics arm of the ANA.

Objectives
Its stated objectives are to advance and protect responsible data-driven marketing.

Data-driven marketing can include any marketing where consumer data is used for marketing purposes, usually to create a more customized experience – like presenting custom offers in an email, recognizing a regular customer on a website, providing benefits through a loyalty program, showing recommendations on a website, or inclusion other special customer groups.  It can include many marketing channels, such as postal mail, email, social, inserts, web advertising, publishing/content marketing and search.

Members of DMA agree to comply with strict guidelines, which set ethical standards for the right way to use data responsibly in marketing. These cover aspects like privacy, data collection, consumer notice, use of data and other aspects of responsible marketing.  DMA enforces these guidelines, accepting complaints from consumers or other companies, and after a member review of the practices and allowing the company to change any non-compliant practices, then publishes a list of "bad actors".   These non compliance companies are also reported to the appropriate authorities.

In addition to supporting those industry standards and agreeing to follow the Member Principles, companies that use data in marketing join DMA to network, grow their business, train their staff and participate in advocacy efforts. DMA does not address the use of consumer data for other, non-marketing uses.

History
The DMA was founded in 1917 as the Direct Mail Marketing Association. Over the next few decades it became
 the Direct Marketing Association and then
 the Data & Marketing Association.

The organization launched the International ECHO Awards in 1929.

As of when John Gitlitz left the American Advertising Federation in 1981 to become president/CEO of theDMA, the latter's headquarters were in NYC, although their Washington DC office was important to them.

Consumer options
A Washington Post 2018 review of what some people call "junk mail" and its professional defenders "the Data & Marketing Association (formerly the Direct Marketing Association)" call "direct mail" notes that, since 
 surveys by the US Postal Service finds more than half of all millennials "find marketing mail valuable" and 
 marketers have found "the response rate to physical mail is over five times that of email" 
direct marketers "would rather not spend their money sending direct mail to people who don’t want to receive it."

While getting off their list is not free, the article said that "The service costs $2 and lasts for 10 years".

The same article noted that "credit card offers are one of the biggest categories in your mailbox" and that one can opt out of these at no cost. Details can be found at DMAChoice.org.

Consumer complaints about marketing practices are also accepted at the thedma.org website.

Criticism of the DMA includes that compliance is voluntary; that enforcement is limited; and that the requirement for consumers to opt out of direct marketing, rather than opting in, favors marketers by making direct marketing the default.

International Federation of Direct Marketing Associations
23 direct marketing trade associations from five continents established the International Federation of Direct Marketing Associations (IFDMA) in 1989.

IFDMA was formed to develop firm lines of communications between direct marketers around the world, and is dedicated to 
 improving the practice and communicating the value of direct marketing and
 promoting the highest standards for ethical conduct and effective self-regulation of the direct marketing community.

Specifically, the organization and its members
 Makes available information regarding consumer safeguards, and publicizes DMA as their protector, contact point and regulator.
 Tries to ensure that members create consumer confidence.
 Advises how companies should use information by operating within the terms of Data Protection Acts.
 Lobbies against 
 Data Protection Acts which protect data against redistribution
 Laws forbidding e-mail address harvesting.

They also:
 Fight negative images of the direct marketing industry
 Promote direct marketing techniques and companies to consumers
 Prove training and professional development opportunities to marketers
 Conduct industry research
 Host networking conferences for marketers

National Members of IFDMA
The first president of IFDMA, Colin Lloyd, is president at the Direct Marketing Association in Britain.

UK DMA
Although the UK DMA is based in the United Kingdom, its 1,000+ members, which include companies from 
other countries, are
 major brand clients
 charities
 advertising and digital agencies and 
 suppliers of direct marketing services.

Headquarters is in London; there are three regional offices. Together they represent the whole of the United Kingdom, Scotland, Northern Ireland and Wales.

UK DMA
 gives advice how companies should use information by operating within the terms of the UK Data Protection Act.
 manages the industry's preference services:
 the Corporate Telephone Preference Service (CTPS)

These services are designed to make consumers aware of the services that stop mail, email, telephone and fax marketing to them as individuals

Agency/Broker vs Direct clients
 An agency is defined where there is a third party involved in the decision making process, typically an agency/broker will source the whole of market for the best available opportunities for the client, and will take receipt of the data and forward onto the end user, and will take a negotiable commission typically 10-20%, agencies are ultimately not the decision maker but a strong influence in this process, market research agencies fall into agency/broker where the data is to be used by an end user.
 A Direct client is defined where there is a direct relationship between the data owner and the decision maker, this is further defined that there is no commission payable in these circumstances, market research agencies can be classified as direct only where the results of a campaign are shared but not the data, call centres are defined as a direct client, although the data is being used on behalf of client(s), or the call centre owner, as long as there is no commission due, and the relationship is direct between them and the data owner.

Controversy
Direct Marketing Associations have attracted controversy, as people believe they aim to promote spam and to defend junk mail and unsolicited telemarketing, which many consumers find irritating and intrusive. They have been accused, by The Spamhaus Project and Electronic Frontier Foundation respectively, of promoting spam and working against open standards (i.e., Do Not Track) that seek to protect consumer privacy from tracking by online marketers. They have also been accused of using a "limited", unrealistic definition of spam.

ICO Case Reference Number IC-138413-V0L3. Available upon request from the ICO. 
The DMA received a complaint of marketing to a personal email address without compliance of data protection legislation and PECR. 
On 26 Oct 2021 the DMA stated "it is not direct marketing and does not involve personal data it does not require a legal basis."
Despite the DMA being listed as a member of its own organisation, The Data and marketing commission (DMC) refused to investigate.
"We do agree with you that matters should be investigated openly and impartially.  The position of the Commission, however, remains the same as last October when we corresponded.  The Commission only investigates complaints against members of the Data & Marketing Association and the Association would not constitute a member of its own Association.  It does appear from the screenshot that you sent over that the Association is listed however, and I will let them know.  Looking at the Association address on the screenshot it states ‘test’ so I think this is probably a technical error."

On 27 April 2022 the DMA was deemed to have not complied with their data protection obligations.

Telemarketing legislation
The United States National Do Not Call Registry, went into effect in 2003. Under the law, it is illegal for telemarketers to call anyone who has registered themselves on the list.  After the list had operated for one year, over 62 million people had signed up. The telemarketing industry opposed the creation of the list, but most telemarketers have complied with the law and refrained from calling people who are on the list.

Canada has passed legislation to create a similar Do Not Call List. In other countries it is voluntary, such as the New Zealand Name Removal Service.

See also
 American Association of Advertising Agencies
 Data Protection Act 1998
 Direct Marketing Ass'n v. Brohl
 Direct Marketing Association (South Africa)

References

External links
  Data & Marketing Association
 Direct Marketing
 UK DMA website
 Mailing Preference Service (MPS)
 Baby Mailing Preference Service (BMPS)
 Telephone Preference Service (TPS)
 Fax Preference Service (FPS)
 Postwatch The UK's watchdog for postal services
 Mailing Preference Service An Opt-out or Robinson list service which allows UK residents to control access to their addresses

Direct marketing
Marketing organizations
Trade associations based in the United States
Business organisations based in the United Kingdom
1917 establishments in the United States
Organizations established in 1917